Hulusi Akar (born 12 March 1952) is the current Turkish minister of defense and a former four-star Turkish Armed Forces general who served as the 29th chief of the Turkish General Staff. Akar also served as a brigade commander in various NATO engagements including the International Security Assistance Force against the Taliban insurgency, Operation Deliberate Force during the Bosnian War, the Kosovo Force during the Kosovo War, as well as overseeing much of the Turkish involvement in the Syrian Civil War.

Early life and education
Akar was born in 1952 in Kayseri, Turkey. He graduated from the Turkish Military Academy in 1972 and the Turkish Infantry School in 1973. In 1975 he attended Queen's University Belfast for postgraduate studies in International Diplomacy.

He attended academic programs in Computer Programming at Middle East Technical University and International Relations at Ankara University, Faculty of Political Sciences, and completed his doctorate at Boğaziçi University. His doctoral thesis, which included the political and military developments in 1919 on the Turkish-American relations to the fore through American archive documents, was published as a book by the Turkish Historical Society under the title of "Harbord Military Mission Report: Studies an American Fact-Finding Mission Conducted and Their Impacts on Turkish-American Relations".

Military career
Akar served as a company commander, section chief and branch chief at various units and headquarters including the Turkish General Staff. He also served as an instructor at the Army Command and Staff College and was posted abroad as a staff officer in the intelligence division at Allied Forces Southern Europe (AFSOUTH) from 1990-1993. From 1993 until 1994, he was the Military Assistant to the Land Forces Commander, and also served as the Chief Public Information Officer. Later on, he continued this assignment for the Commander of the Turkish Armed Forces from 1994–1997. He was subsequently posted as the Commander of the Turkish Brigade - Zenica/Bosnia from 1997 until 1998.

Upon his promotion to brigadier general in 1998, he commanded the Internal Security Brigade for two years, and then served as the Chief of Plans and Policy in AFSOUTH from 2000-2002. Following his promotion to major general in 2002, he assumed the command of the Military Academy for three years and was subsequently the Commander of the Army Command and Staff College for two years until 2007.

After his promotion to lieutenant general, he was the commander of Land Forces Logistics and then the Commander of the NATO Rapid Deployable Corps-Turkey and the 3rd Corps from 2009-2011. Subsequent to his promotion to the rank of general in 2011, he served as the Deputy Chief of the Turkish General Staff from 2011 until 2013, and the Commander of the Turkish Land Forces from 2013 until 2015.

On 2 August 2015, General Akar was appointed as the 29th chief of the General Staff and took up the position on 18 August 2015.

Chief of General Staff 

Akar was taken hostage on 15 July 2016 during the Turkish Armed Forces' 2016 attempted coup d'état against the Turkish government, by those responsible for leading the attempted coup. According to The Economist, Akar "was told by his aides to sign a declaration of martial law (sıkıyönetim). When he refused, they tightened a belt around his neck, but he would not yield." He was held hostage at Akıncı Air Base (now Mürted Airfield Command) in Ankara before pro-government forces retook control of the air base and rescued him in the early hours of 16 July 2016.

The rescue was announced at 02:45 EEST on 16 July 2016 by Anadolu Agency, although CNN Türk placed the time of rescue attempt around 07:45 EEST. First Army commander General Ümit Dündar served as Acting Chief of General Staff during Akar's capture. After his release he testified that one of his captors offered to put him on the phone with alleged coup figurehead Fethullah Gülen.

In 2016 Akar led Operation Euphrates Shield, the Turkish military intervention in Syria against the jihadist group ISIL, the Syrian Democratic Forces, and various other armed militant-Kurdish groups (the SDF and other armed militant-Kurdish groups are also fighting ISIL).

As defense minister

On July 9, 2018 Akar was appointed by Turkey's president Erdogan as the Minister for National Defense. This was the first time in Turkey's history that a civilian government appointed an active duty military officer to this position.

In July 2020, reacting to the 2020 Armenian–Azerbaijani clashes, Akar said: "We will continue to stand with the Azerbaijani armed forces and provide support to our Azerbaijani brothers against Armenia, which continues its aggressive approach." During the Turkish invasion in Northern Iraq against the Kurdistan Workers' Party (PKK) which is designated as a terrorist organization by Turkey, he visited a Turkish military base in Iraq. He supports the installation of the Russian S-400 missile system despite the opposition of Turkeys NATO allies. In November 2021, he has denied an existence of Kurdistan, be it in Turkey or Iraq in a trilateral discussion with Tulay Hatimogullari Oruç and Garo Paylan in the Turkish Parliament over the use of chemical weapons in Iraqi Kurdistan.

On 17 April 2022, Turkey launched Operation Claw-Lock against militants of the Kurdistan Workers' Party (PKK) which has also been designated as a terrorist organization by the U.S. and the European Union.

Awards and decorations 
Akar has been awarded the:

 – TAF Medal of Distinguished Service
 – TAF Medal of Distinguished Courage and Self-Sacrifice
 – TAF Medal of Honor
 – Nishan-e-Imtiaz
 – Legion of Merit
 – Order of National Security Merit of South Korea
 – Distinguished Service in Military Cooperation Medal
 – 20th Anniversary Medal of the Armed Forces of Kazakhstan
 – Chief of Staff Distinguished Service Medal

Personal life 
Akar is married to Şule, with whom he has two children. In addition to Turkish, he is also fluent in English and Italian.

See also

List of Chiefs of the Turkish General Staff
List of Ministers of National Defence of Turkey

References

1952 births
People from Kayseri
Turkish Army generals
Commanders of the Turkish Land Forces
Chiefs of the Turkish General Staff
Living people
People involved in the 2016 Turkish coup d'état attempt
Recipients of Nishan-e-Imtiaz
Ministers of National Defence of Turkey
Members of the 66th government of Turkey